Omar Said Ali (Born 1 July 1945 in Silemani) is a Kurdish politician and the General Coordinator  of the Gorran Movement.

References 

1945 births
Iraqi Sunni Muslims
Gorran Movement politicians
Kurdish politicians
Living people
People from Sulaymaniyah